Erik Sandewall is a Swedish Professor in the Chair of Computer Science at Linköping University since 1975. He is known for his pioneering research in artificial intelligence.

Education 
Erik Sandewall received the B.A. and Ph.D. degrees from Uppsala University in 1964 and 1969 respectively.

Notable Honors and Awards  

 AAAI Fellow
 ECCAI Fellow
 Member of the Royal Swedish Academy of Engineering Sciences (1981)
 Member of the Swedish Academy of Sciences (1992)
 Doctor honoris causa Paul Sabatier University, France
 Chevalier of the Legion of Honor, France
 Fellow of the German Research Centre for Artificial Intelligence
 Associate Member of the Hassan II Academy of Science and Technology, Morocco
 Immortalized as statue outside of the Department of Computer and Information Science, Linköping University

See also 
 Frame problem
 Yale shooting problem
 Funarg problem

References

External links
 Erik Sandewall's personal web page

Swedish computer scientists
Academic staff of Linköping University
Members of the Royal Swedish Academy of Engineering Sciences
Members of the Royal Swedish Academy of Sciences
1945 births
Living people
Chevaliers of the Légion d'honneur